Grassy Creek is a  long 2nd order tributary to the Dan River in Halifax County, Virginia.

Course 
Grassy Creek rises about 0.5 miles west of Centerville, Virginia, and then flows northeast to join the Dan River about 2 miles northwest of Omega.

Watershed 
Grassy Creek drains  of area, receives about 45.7 in/year of precipitation, has a wetness index of 421.95, and is about 54% forested.

See also 
 List of Virginia Rivers

References

Watershed Maps 

Rivers of Virginia
Rivers of Halifax County, Virginia
Tributaries of the Roanoke River